Cesare Montecucco (born 1 November 1947, in Trento) is an Italian pathologist and full professor at University of Padua, Italy. He was awarded the Paul Ehrlich and Ludwig Darmstaedter Prize in 2011 for his researches on tetanus, botulism, anthrax and Helicobacter pylori-related diseases.

Throughout his career, he was the recipient of many international awards in recognition for his research accomplishments in the fields of pathology, toxicology and immunology.

Bibliography

References

1947 births
Living people
Italian pathologists
Academic staff of the University of Padua